Ahmad Solehin bin Mamat (born 24 March 1996) is a Malaysian footballer who plays as a goalkeeper for Kelantan in the Malaysia Premier League.

Club career

Melaka United
On 3 November 2016, after an impressive season with Melaka United, the club has offered new contract to retain for another season. However, he left the club to Kuala Lumpur at the end of the season.

Kuala Lumpur
On 29 November 2016, Solehin signed a one-year contract with Kuala Lumpur after won the 2016 Malaysia Premier League championship with Melaka United.

Career statistics

Club

References

External links
 

1996 births
People from Malacca
Living people
Malaysian people of Malay descent
Malaysian footballers
Kuala Lumpur City F.C. players
Melaka United F.C. players
Association football goalkeepers